Broadcasting is the transmission of audio and video signals.

Broadcast or Broadcasting may also refer to:

Music 
 Broadcast (band), an English electronic music band
 The Broadcast (band), an American Americana/soul band
 Broadcast (Cutting Crew album), 1986
 Broadcast (Meese album), 2009
 Broadcasting..., an album by Comeback Kid, 2007
 "The Broadcast", a song by Wings from Back to the Egg, 1979
 Broadcast Twelve Records, a British record label of the 1920s

Magazines 
 Broadcast (magazine), a weekly newspaper for the UK television and radio industry
 Broadcasting (magazine), a weekly US television industry trade magazine

Computing 
 Broadcast address, an IP address allowing information to be sent to all machines on a given subnet
 Broadcasting (networking), transmitting a packet that will be received by every device on the network
 Broadcast (parallel pattern), communication pattern to distribute a message to all machines in a cluster
 Broadcast domain, a logical area where any computer connected to the network can directly transmit to any other

Other uses 
 
 Broadcast sowing, a method of hand sowing of seeds
 Radio program
 Television show
 Broadcast.com

he:שיטות הפצה בתקשורת נתונים#Broadcast